Abdullah Al-Wazzan is a film director, screenwriter and film producer. He was born in Kuwait City, Kuwait in 1990. Al-Wazzan developed an interest in filmmaking in his early preteens. At the age of 17 he studied Architecture, And graduated with a Bachelor of Architecture in 2012. He went on to create the animated short film Falafel Cart (2019) which was officially submitted to the 92nd Academy Awards in the animated short film category. The film was officially selected at the Hiroshima International Animation Festival and won best international short film at the Los Angeles Animation Festival. In 2021 Al-Wazzan won best animated short film at the Burbank International Film Festival. Falafel Cart received nominations at D.C. Independent Film Festival, Palm Springs International Animation Festival, Southampton International Film Festival and Ajyal Film Festival. And was officially selected at Athens Animfest, Sonoma International Film Festival, Rabat International Author Film Festival and Montreal International Animation Film Festival.

In May 2017, the Doha Film Institute announced that Abdullah Al-Wazzan's drama, thriller "Soaring over Mayhem" is one of five short films to receive its annual grant.

Filmography

Awards

References

External links 

 Abdullah Al-Wazzan on IMDb
 Falafel Cart on IMDb
 Soaring over Mayhem on IMDb
 Falafel Cart film site

Kuwaiti film directors
Kuwaiti screenwriters
Kuwaiti film producers
Arabic-language film directors
1990 births
Living people